Killamarsh West is a former railway station in Halfway, South Yorkshire, England.

History
It was closed in 1843 by George Hudson during a period of financial difficulty.

A new station was built by the Midland Railway in 1873. Although locally it was commonly known as Killamarsh Midland, the name was not officially adopted. It was renamed Killamarsh West by British Railways in 1950.

It was of typical Midland design, brick built and timber, with a foot crossing between the platforms.

The station closed in 1954. The line is now part of the current Midland Main Line.

Today
There are virtually no remains of the station today, other than a large space beside the railway line where the platforms once occupied.
The site is inaccessible as the line remains open.

Passenger services
In 1922 passenger services calling at Killamarsh West were at their most intensive, with trains serving three destinations via three overlapping routes:

 On Sundays only 
 On Mondays to Saturdays three stopping services plied between Sheffield (MR) and Chesterfield
 most ran direct down the "New Road" through  and went nowhere near Killamarsh West.
 the other two services went the "long way round" via the "Old Road". They set off north eastwards from Sheffield (MR) towards Rotherham then swung east to go south along the Old Road
 one of these continued past , a short distance before Masboro' then swung hard right, next stop Treeton, then all stations, including Killamarsh West, to Chesterfield, 
 the other continued past  then swung right onto the Sheffield District Railway passing through or calling at West Tinsley and Catcliffe before Treeton, after which they called at all stations to Chesterfield.

See also
Three stations served the village of Killamarsh, all of which started as plain "Killamarsh":
 on the former LD&ECR's "Beighton Branch", and
Killamarsh West which is the subject of this article.

References

Notes

Sources

External links
Killamarsh West (in white) on 1955 OS Map npemaps
Killamarsh West StationKllamarsh

Disused railway stations in Sheffield
Former Midland Railway stations
Railway stations in Great Britain opened in 1841
Railway stations in Great Britain closed in 1954